Earl Oliver Christy (born March 19, 1943) is a former professional American football player who played cornerback for three seasons for the New York Jets.

College
Earl “The Twirl" Christy better known by friends as "The Super Bowl Champ" or "Mr. Inspiration" was inducted into the Hawk Hall of Fame in 1984. Earl came to Maryland State College (MSC)
from Perryman, Maryland in 1961. Earl attended Havre de Grace Consolidated School in Havre de Grace, Maryland. At the tiny all-
Black school, Earl was known as “All World”. You name it and he did it. In track and field, Earl high jumped 6 feet
and 4 inches and threw the shot put 49 feet and 9 inches. In addition, Earl’s basketball prowess was legendary. He 
had a 40-inch vertical leap and once scored an amazing 43 points in a single game while the opposing losing team scored a total 42 points. Earl was a four-year letterman on 
the Hawks’ football team. During his four-year career, the MSC Hawk football program compiled a record of 17 wins, 
2 ties and 9 losses. Earl, a dean lists student, graduated from MSC in 1967 with a degree in Physical Education.

NFL career
The New York Jets signed Earl in 1966 to play defensive back, kick off, and punt return specialist. 
Earl played for the N.Y. Jets for 3 years and was one of five Hawks who played in the 1968 Super Bowl (3 Jets and 2 Colts). He played for the New York Jets from 1966 to 1969. He played position of half back and defensive back and during Super Bowl III had a 25 yd kick off return. Earl ended his professional NFL career with 34 punt returns for 222 yards and 58 kick off returns for 1323 yards. Earl was an integral member of the Jets 1968 Super Championship team. 

Earl Christy has the distinction of playing the proverbial bookend to the nadir and zenith of the Jets' moments against 
their most hated 1968 rival, the Oakland Raiders. First, there's the Heidi Game, the extraordinary watershed moment in the history of TV's coverage of professional football. The histrionics of the game itself are well-known: fights, penalties,
ejections, then a little girl traipsing through the Alps. With the Raiders ahead with 1:05 to go, their kickoff went to Earl Christy who fumbled it at the 12 (although he has insisted numerous times - rightfully so - that the ball was actually knocked out of his hands by a teammate during the play), with the Raiders recovering in the end zone. Raiders 43 Jets 32. This was the nadir.

Then, leap ahead a few weeks later, to Shea Stadium and the AFL Championship against Oakland. 
After the Raiders scored in the fourth quarter to take the lead at 23-20, Christy takes the kickoff and runs it back 32 yards 
to set up a Namath pass to Sauer, followed by Namath's wild throw to Don Maynard, which then set up the clinching touchdown.

Heidi Game

The 1968 season also saw the Jets involved in one of the most notorious incidents in television history, an incident that would change the way television networks carried sporting events for decades to come.  On November 17, 1968, just before 7:30pm Eastern time, the Jets scored late to take a 32–29 lead over the Oakland Raiders with 1:05 left.  NBC cut to a commercial, and then everywhere but the West Coast showed the movie Heidi, a show which NBC had promoted extensively for the sweeps period.  Outraged fans bombarded NBC headquarters in New York with phone calls demanding the game be restored; so many phone calls were made that they eventually knocked out the NBC switchboard.  Even though a decision was made to carry the game to conclusion, this decision could not be communicated, thus resulting in the movie starting on schedule.

Fans' ire was further fueled when they discovered that NBC's cutting away from the game denied them from seeing live a dramatic finish.  On the Raiders' second play from scrimmage on the next drive, Daryle Lamonica threw a 46-yard touchdown pass to Charlie Smith, giving the Raiders a 36–32 lead.  On the ensuing kickoff, Earl Christy of the Jets fumbled at the 10 yard line, which the Raiders' Preston Ridlehuber converted into another touchdown, ultimately giving the Raiders a 43–32 victory.  Much of the country learned of this final outcome only via a bottom-of-screen crawl line shown during the movie.  This incident, dubbed the Heidi Game, resulted in most television networks and sports leagues amending their television policies to ensure that games in progress would be broadcast to their conclusion, no matter what, even if it meant delaying or canceling the rest of the network's lineup, and even if the game's outcome seemed assured.

Sources
 pro-football-reference.com 

1943 births
American football cornerbacks
Maryland Eastern Shore Hawks football players
New York Jets players
Living people
People from Perryman, Maryland
Sportspeople from the Baltimore metropolitan area
American Football League players